Thomas C. Alexander (born July 25, 1956, in Seneca, South Carolina) is an American businessman who is currently serving as the President of the South Carolina Senate. He serves in the senate as a Republican from the 1st District. Alexander served as an honorary chair of the 2023 Inauguration Committee for Governor Henry McMaster.

S.C. General Assembly
Alexander was first elected as a Democrat to the South Carolina House of Representatives in 1986. He was elected to the South Carolina Senate in 1994 also as a Democrat. He switched parties in 1996. Alexander is the chairman of the Senate Labor, Commerce and Industry committee. He also serves on the Banking and Insurance, Finance, Invitations and Medical Affairs committees.

He is a member of the American Legislative Exchange Council (ALEC), serving as South Carolina state leader.

Alexander serves as Vice-Chair of the College and University Trustee Screening Commission, a Joint Committee with members from the House and Senate.

Personal
Alexander is the owner of an office supply store. He and his wife Lynda live in Walhalla, South Carolina.

External links
South Carolina Legislature - Senator Thomas C. Alexander official SC Senate website
Project Vote Smart - Senator Thomas C. Alexander (SC) profile
Follow the Money - Thomas C. Alexander
2006 2004 2002 2000 1996 campaign contributions

References

1956 births
21st-century American politicians
Anderson University (South Carolina) alumni
Living people
Republican Party members of the South Carolina House of Representatives
People from Seneca, South Carolina
People from Walhalla, South Carolina
Republican Party South Carolina state senators